Diana Prazak (born 20 July 1979) is an Australian professional boxer who held the WBC female super-featherweight title from 2013 to 2014. She is the first Australian boxer to have been ranked as the best active boxer, pound-for-pound, by BoxRec.

Amateur career
At the age of 27, Prazak joined a local boxing gym to lose weight. She took her first amateur fight at 64 kg after six months of training. As an amateur fighter Prazak had six fights and won them all via stoppage. The last such fight was for a national title, making her the Australian Amateur Light Welterweight Champion. This was her last amateur fight before turning professional.

Professional career
Prazak made her professional boxing debut on 13 March 2010 in Moonee Valley, Victoria, Australia. She was defeated via unanimous decision after six rounds with fellow Australian Sarah Howett.
In 2013, she fought against Super Featherweight Champion Frida Wallberg, who was defeated by her in Sweden with a knock out in the 8th round. Prazak won the title, Wallberg was hospitalized and received emergency surgery to relieve the pressure on her brain from a cerebral haemorrhage.

This fight, and the road leading to it, is captured in the documentary Bittersweet, showing Dutch former professional boxer Lucia Rijker training Diane to prepare her for the fight.

Championships and accomplishments
2013 / 2014 – WBC Super Featherweight World Title (1 defense)
2011 / 2012 – WIBA Super Featherweight World Title (2 defenses)
2011 – PABA Super Featherweight Title
2011 – Australian Light Welterweight Title
WIBA International Super Featherweight Title
Australian Lightweight Champion
Australian Amateur Light Welterweight Champion
Women Boxing Archive Network World Super Featherweight Champion

Professional boxing record

References

External links

 Diana Prazak at Awakening Fighters

1979 births
Living people
Australian women boxers
Boxers from Melbourne
Super-featherweight boxers
Lightweight boxers
Light-welterweight boxers
World super-featherweight boxing champions
World Boxing Council champions
Australian people of Croatian descent
Australian people of Maltese descent